Cotford St Luke is a village and civil parish in the district of Somerset West and Taunton, Somerset, England. Cotford St Luke is a new village that was established following the closure of Tone Vale Hospital and Cotford Asylum in the 1990s. The old asylum buildings were converted into housing commencing in the late 1990s.

Amenities and landmarks
The former hospital St Luke's chapel, which is a Grade II listed building built in the 1890s, was converted into a public house/restaurant and opened on 13 July 2008, after being derelict for 18 years. The pub closed in May 2011 and subsequently re-opened on 16 November 2012 under new ownership. It is called The Chapel.

Dene Barton Community Hospital is a modern hospital located in the village, and has 40 beds for elderly patients needing acute care or rehabilitation.

The village also has a small supermarket and a community centre/village hall.

St Luke's Centre was opened by the Bishop of Bath and Wells on 21 October 2019 as a Parish Centre of worship and a community Hub for the village of Cotford St. Luke.

Schools 
Cotford St Luke Community Primary School is situated on the edge of the village. It was built on what were the grounds of the asylum playing fields and opened in September 2003.  The school has 10 classes and caters for children from 4 to 11 years, with a pre-school on site for children from the age of 3 years.

The catchment area secondary school is Kingsmead School in Wiveliscombe. The school provides a free bus service for children in the catchment areas including Cotford St Luke.

Public transport
Cotford St Luke is served by the number 25 scheduled bus service provided by The Buses of Somerset on the Taunton - Wiveliscombe - Dulverton route. These run approximately every hour daytimes Monday to Saturday in both directions. Other destinations, including Bridgwater and Kingston St Mary are also served but less frequently.

Civil parish
In 2011 Cotford St Luke civil parish was created; previously the village was part of Bishops Lydeard civil parish. On 5 May 2011, Cotford St Luke Parish Council was first elected. Seven parish councillors were elected un-opposed.

References

External links
Cotford St Luke Parish Council

Villages in Taunton Deane
Civil parishes in Somerset